Ndanda is a Bamileke language of Cameroon. Dialects are Ungameha (West: shingu, Batchingou) and Undimeha (East: gwa, Bangwa); Batoufam is a subdialect of the latter.

References

Emmanuel Tchapnda, 1979, Bamiléké (batchingou) – Deutsch Wörterbuch

Languages of Cameroon
Bamileke languages